How to Succeed in Business Without Really Trying may refer to: 
 How to Succeed in Business Without Really Trying (book), a 1952 book written by Shepherd Mead and the inspiration for the musical of the same name.
 How to Succeed in Business Without Really Trying (musical), a 1961 musical adapted by Frank Loesser with Abe Burrows, Jack Weinstock, and Willie Gilbert
 How to Succeed in Business Without Really Trying (film), a 1967 film adapted and directed by David Swift